Óskar Sigurpálsson (born 21 December 1945) is an Icelandic weightlifter. He competed at the 1968 Summer Olympics and the 1972 Summer Olympics.

References

1945 births
Living people
Icelandic male weightlifters
Olympic weightlifters of Iceland
Weightlifters at the 1968 Summer Olympics
Weightlifters at the 1972 Summer Olympics